Aldaz may refer to:

Mount Aldaz, a mountain of Marie Byrd Land, Antarctica
13004 Aldaz, a main-belt minor planet

People with the surname
Huberto Aldaz (born 1957), Mexican politician
Telmo Aldaz de la Quadra-Salcedo (born 1970), Spanish adventurer, media personality and politician